Magloire is a surname. Notable people with the surname include:

 Jamaal Magloire (born 1978), Canadian professional basketball player
 Paul Magloire (1907–2001), President of Haiti
 Réjane Magloire (21st century), American singer
 Stevenson Magloire (1963–1994), Haitian artist

French-language surnames